Dom Sara (also Romanized as Dom Sarā) is a village in Sakht Sar Rural District, in the Central District of Ramsar County, Mazandaran Province, Iran. At the 2006 census, its population was 34, in 9 families.

References 

Populated places in Ramsar County